Newton Lake may refer to:

Newton Lake State Fish and Wildlife Area, a protected area in Illinois
Newton Lake (Lake County, Minnesota), a lake in Minnesota